Roquezia is a genus of horse flies in the family Tabanidae.

Species
Roquezia signifera (Wiedemann, 1821)

References

Tabanidae
Diptera of South America
Brachycera genera